Hypericum addingtonii is a shrubby species of flowering plant in the family Hypericaceae. It is native to China and was described by Norman Robson in 1985.

Description
Hypericum addingtonii ranges from 1.5–2 meters in height. Its stems are yellow-brown.

Distribution and habitat
The species is found in parts of China, in northwestern and western Yunnan bamboo thickets, grassy slopes, and hemlock forest edges.

Name
Hypericum addingtonii is known as die hua jin si tao in Chinese and Addington hypericum in English. It was named for its collector, P. Addington.

References

addingtoni
Flora of China
Plants described in 1985